The Vietnam International Series is an international badminton tournament held in Vietnam. This tournament has been an International Series level since it was established in 2014. Another tournament named Vietnam International was established in 2000, and the Vietnam Open was established in 1996.

Previous winners

Performances by nation

References 

Badminton tournaments in Vietnam
Sports competitions in Vietnam